The 2021 World Athletics Relays have been held in Chorzów, Poland from 1 to 2 May 2021.

Schedule 
The program has undergone some changes, due to the lack of participants some preliminary rounds have in fact been canceled.

Winners summary
There are no medalists but winners in each event.

Men

Women

Mixed

Winners positions
As the World Athletics Relays are not a championship, there are no champions or medalists, but just winners.

Team standings
Teams scored for every place in the top 8 with 8 points awarded for first place, 7 for second, etc. The overall points winner was given the Golden Baton.

Participating nations
37 nations were due to take part in the competition, before the renouncement of Canada, India, Jamaica, Nigeria, and Trinidad and Tobago. Other notable absences include Australia, China and the USA, who will all be missing the event for the first time. Zambia are set to make their debut.

Spanish Ángel David Rodríguez, 41, is the oldest athlete entered for the event, while 17-year-old Nigerian sprinter Imaobong Nse Uko is the youngest competitor.

 (13)
 (12)
 (21)
 (20)
 (26)
 (6)
 (9)
 (5)
 (31)
 (12)
 (6)
 (10)
 (40)
 (40)
 (11)
 (16)
 (20)
 (16)
 (38)
 (39)
 (29)
 (36)
 (24)
 (24) 
 (44)
 (16)
 (5)
 (10)
 (2)
 (16)
 (40)
 (14)
 (8)
 (16)
 (5)
 (5)
 (7)

References

External links
 
 World Athletics website
 Official program
 Facts and figures
 world relays silesia 21 Instagram World Athletics Relays

 
World Athletics Relays
World Relays
World Athletics Relays
International athletics competitions hosted by Poland
World Athletics Relays